Comostolodes is a genus of moths in the family Geometridae.

Species
 Comostolodes albicatena Warren, 1896
 Comostolodes chlorochromodes Prout
 Comostolodes dialitha (West, 1930)
 Comostolodes subhyalina Warren
 Comostolodes tenera Warren

References
 Comostolodes at Markku Savela's Lepidoptera and Some Other Life Forms
 Natural History Museum Lepidoptera genus database

Geometrinae